Bohuslav Ebermann (born 19 September 1948 in Vochov) is a retired professional ice hockey player who played in the Czechoslovak Extraliga. He played for Škoda Plzeň. He was a member of the Czechoslovak 1976 Canada Cup team and was a silver medalist at the 1976 Winter Olympics. He also played in the 1980 Winter Olympics, and captained the Czechoslovakian team to fifth place out of twelve. He scored three goals and added an assist in the tournament.

References

External links
 
 
 
 
 

1948 births
Living people
Czech ice hockey left wingers
Czechoslovak ice hockey left wingers
Olympic ice hockey players of Czechoslovakia
Olympic silver medalists for Czechoslovakia
Olympic medalists in ice hockey
Ice hockey players at the 1976 Winter Olympics
Ice hockey players at the 1980 Winter Olympics
Medalists at the 1976 Winter Olympics
HC Dukla Jihlava players
HC Plzeň players
Lausanne HC players
Brûleurs de Loups players
People from Plzeň-North District
Czechoslovak expatriate sportspeople in Switzerland
Czechoslovak expatriate sportspeople in France
Sportspeople from the Plzeň Region
Expatriate ice hockey players in Switzerland
Expatriate ice hockey players in France
Czechoslovak expatriate ice hockey people